Portneuf—Jacques-Cartier (formerly known as Portneuf) is a federal electoral district in Quebec, Canada, that has been represented in the House of Commons of Canada since 1867. Its population in 2001 was 87,141.

Demographics
Ethnic groups: 99.1% White
Languages: 97.0% French, 2.0% English 
Religions: 94.0% Catholic, 1.4% Protestant, 4.2% no religious affiliation 
Average income: $28,030

Geography
The district includes the Regional County Municipalities of Portneuf and La Jacques-Cartier as well as the municipality of Saint-Augustin-de-Desmaures. The main communities are Saint-Augustin-de-Desmaures, Donnacona, Lac-Beauport, Neuville, Pont-Rouge, Shannon, Stoneham-et-Tewkesbury, Saint-Raymond, Sainte-Catherine-de-la-Jacques-Cartier, and Deschambault-Grondines. Its area is 7,617 km2.

History
The electoral district was created in the British North America Act of 1867 as "Portneuf". It was renamed "Portneuf—Jacques-Cartier" on 1 September 2004.

The Conservative Party did not run a candidate in Portneuf—Jacques-Cartier in the 2008 and 2011 elections as incumbent independent André Arthur was a self-described libertarian who consistently voted with and supported the Conservative Party in the House of Commons.

There were no changes to this riding during the 2012 electoral redistribution.

Members of Parliament
This riding has elected the following members of the House of Commons of Canada:

Election results

Portneuf—Jacques-Cartier

Portneuf

Note: Change in popular vote is calculated from popular vote in the 1896 general election.

See also
 List of Canadian federal electoral districts
 Past Canadian electoral districts

References

Campaign expense data from Elections Canada
Riding history for Portneuf from the Library of Parliament
Riding history for Portneuf—Jacques-Cartier from the Library of Parliament
2011 Results from Elections Canada

Notes

Quebec federal electoral districts
Capitale-Nationale